Ngola was the title for rulers of the Ndongo kingdom which existed from the sixteenth to the seventeenth century in  what is now north-west Angola.  The full title was "Ngola a Kiluanje", which is often shortened to simply "Ngola", hence the name of the modern country.

See also
 Ndongo
 List of Ngolas of Ndongo
 History of Angola
 Ngola (language)

References

Matamban and Ndongo monarchs
16th century in Angola
17th century in Angola